Haft Dasht may refer to:
 Haft Dasht-e Olya